Varanus rasmusseni is a species of lizard of the Varanidae family. It is found in the Philippines.

References

Varanus
Reptiles described in 2010
Reptiles of the Philippines